The Molasses River is a  river in Gladwin County, Michigan, in the United States. It is a tributary of the Tittabawassee River, part of the Saginaw River watershed.

See also
List of rivers of Michigan

References

External links
Michigan  Streamflow Data from the USGS

Rivers of Michigan
Rivers of Gladwin County, Michigan
Tributaries of Lake Huron